The following is a list of international organization leaders in 2007.

UN organizations

Political and economic organizations

Financial organizations

Sports organizations

Other organizations

See also
List of state leaders in 2007
List of religious leaders in 2007
List of colonial governors in 2007
List of international organization leaders in 2006
List of international organization leaders in 2008

References

2007
2007 in international relations
Lists of office-holders in 2007